Edward James Slattery (born August 11, 1940) is an American prelate of the Roman Catholic Church who served as bishop of the Diocese of Tulsa in Oklahoma from 1993 to 2016.

Biography

Early life
The second of seven children, Edward Slattery was born on August 11, 1940, in Chicago, Illinois, to William Edward and Winifred Margaret (née Brennan) Slattery; both his paternal and maternal grandparents emigrated to the United States from Ireland.

After attending Visitation of the Blessed Virgin Mary Grade School and Archbishop Quigley Preparatory Seminary in Chicago, Slattery studied at St. Mary of the Lake Seminary in Mundelein, Illinois, obtaining Bachelor of Arts and Master of Divinity degrees.

Priesthood
Slattery was ordained to the priesthood for the Archdiocese of Chicago by Cardinal John Cody on April 26, 1966. After his ordination, Slattery served as associate pastor of St. Jude the Apostle Parish in South Holland, Illinois, until 1971. During this time, he also earned a Master's degree from Loyola University Chicago. He served as vice-president (1971–1976) and president (1976–1994) of the Catholic Church Extension Society. While working at Extension, he was named associate pastor of St. Rose of Lima Parish in Chicago in 1973. He served as pastor of St. Rose of Lima from 1976 to 1989.

Bishop of Tulsa
On November 11, 1993, Pope John Paul II appointed Slattery as the third bishop of the Diocese of Tulsa.  He was consecrated by John Paul II in Rome on January 6, 1994, with Archbishops Giovanni Re and Josip Uhac serving as co-consecrators, in St. Peter's Basilica in Rome. Slattery selected as his episcopal motto: "Tu Solus Sanctus", meaning, "You alone are the Holy One."

Pope Francis accepted Slattery's letter of resignation as bishop of Tulsa on May 13, 2016, appointing Father David Konderla to succeed him.

Views

Undocumented immigrants

In 2006, Slattery said that if a law was passed criminalizing the act of aiding undocumented immigrants, "then [he] will become a criminal," adding,"When it becomes a crime to love the poor and serve their needs, then I will be the first to go to jail for this crime, and I pray that every priest and every deacon in this diocese will have the courage to walk with me into that prison." In 2007, Slattery issued a 21-page pastoral letter in which he condemned Oklahoma House Bill 1804, a strict anti-illegal immigration law which Slattery claimed creates "an atmosphere of repression and terror."

Abortion
During the 2008 U.S. presidential election, Slattery criticized the House Speaker Nancy Pelosi and then U.S. Senator Joe Biden both Catholics, for their remarks on abortion rights for women on the TV program Meet the Press.  Slattery described their positions as "clearly inconsistent with Catholic teaching" and "plainly false."

Liturgy
Slattery was a conservative on question of liturgical practice. He returned to the practice of celebrating the eucharistic liturgy in his cathedral using the ancient style in which the priest and the congregation face the same direction, ad orientem. He believed this form had a number of advantages over the form of in which the priest faces the congregation.

On April 24, 2010, Slattery celebrated high mass at the Basilica of the National Shrine of the Immaculate Conception in Washington, D.C., to mark the fifth anniversary of Pope Benedict XVI's papacy, wearing the rarely seen cappa magna.

Statement on Contraceptive mandates
On February 2, 2012, Bishop Slattery released a statement in response to the contraceptive mandates issued by the United States Department of Health and Human Services under the Patient Protection and Affordable Care Act. Slattery joined other bishops in the United States Conference of Catholic Bishops in opposing the mandate.

References

External links
 pastoral letter  on immigration 

 Catholic Church hierarchy
 Catholic Church in the United States
 Historical list of the Catholic bishops of the United States
 List of Catholic bishops of the United States
 Lists of patriarchs, archbishops, and bishops

Episcopal succession

1940 births
Living people
University of Saint Mary of the Lake alumni
Loyola University Chicago alumni
Roman Catholic Archdiocese of Chicago
Roman Catholic bishops of Tulsa
Clergy from Chicago
American Roman Catholic clergy of Irish descent
20th-century Roman Catholic bishops in the United States
21st-century Roman Catholic bishops in the United States
Religious leaders from Illinois
Catholics from Illinois